Anthony Regis Jones (born August 28, 1984), who goes by the stage name K-Drama, is an American rapper. His first studio album, Behind the Glory, came out in 2006. His Billboard chart debut album, We Fit: The Workout Plan, came out in 2010. His most recent album, Winds & .Waves, was self-released in 2013 and charted on a Billboard chart.

Early life
K-Drama was born on August 28, 1984 as Anthony Regis Jones, in Cincinnati, Ohio, where he still continues to reside. His father is Anthony Kent Jones and mother is Darlene Carol Jones (née, Beatty). He has an older half-brother on his maternal side, Aaron Lee Beatty. He has another older half-sister on his paternal side, Kenya Patreece Jones (Welch).

Personal life
He is married to Charde Jones, and together they have three children, residing in Cincinnati, Ohio.

Music career
His music career started in 2006, with the release of Behind the Glory, with Holy Hip Hop Records. The next major studio release from him, We Fit: The Workout Plan, was released by Cross Movement Records in 2010, and it charted on several Billboard charts. His next project, was a self-released album, Winds & .Waves, which came out in 2013. This got on one Billboard chart.

Discography

Studio albums and mixtapes

References

1984 births
Living people
African-American rappers
African-American Christians
Performers of Christian hip hop music
Rappers from Cincinnati
21st-century American rappers
21st-century African-American musicians
20th-century African-American people